Abortion in Florida is currently legal until the 15th week of gestation and is governed by the State Legislature. The State of Florida banned abortion with limited exceptions in 1900. This ban was overturned in 1973 by the Supreme Court of the United States in the case Roe v. Wade. The Florida Legislature eventually repealed it, and as of 2023, a new case challenging the 15-week abortion ban is pending under court for review.

History

Legislative History 
The State of Florida banned abortion with limited exceptions in 1900. However, this ban was overturned in 1973 by the Supreme Court of the United States in the case Roe v. Wade. The Florida Legislature eventually repealed it.

Florida was one of ten states in 2007 to have a customary informed consent provision for abortions. Abortion providers were required to show women ultrasounds of their fetus before allowing them to have an abortion. In 2013, the Targeted Regulation of Abortion Providers (TRAP) law applied to medically induced abortions as well.

In 2022, the Florida Legislature passed House Bill 5 (HB 5), a bill that banned abortions after 15 weeks of pregnancy. The bill, signed by Governor Ron DeSantis, entered into force on April 14, 2022. The new law faced legal scrutiny as a state judge moved to block enforcement of the law on July 5, 2022. Ruling that the Florida Constitution guaranteed a right to privacy rendered the law unconstitutional. The State of Florida appealed the decision to the Supreme Court of Florida, thereby keeping the law in place while the case is being decided.

Judicial History 
The Supreme Court of the United States's decision in 1973 Roe v. Wade ruling meant the state could no longer regulate abortion in the first trimester. However, the Supreme Court overturned Roe v. Wade in 2022 Dobbs v. Jackson Women's Health Organization ruling.

The Supreme Court of Florida has ruled in 1989 (In re: TW), and 2017 (Gainesville Woman Care, LCC v. the State of Florida) that Article 1, Section 23 of the Constitution of Florida ("Every natural person has the right to be let alone and free from government intrusion into the person's private life") protects a woman's right to an abortion as a matter of state constitutional law, independent of federal law. Following the enacting of a new State law that bans abortions following the 15th week of pregnancy, a new case on the matter was brought to the attention of the Court, which is still pending. 

On June 1, 2022, The American Civil Liberties Union (ACLU), the ACLU of Florida, the Center for Reproductive Rights, Planned Parenthood Federation of America, and the law firm Jenner & Block filed Planned Parenthood of Southwest and Central Florida, et al. v. State of Florida, et al., a lawsuit on behalf of Florida health care providers. On January 23, 2023, the Supreme Court of Florida accepted a request to hear the petitioner's arguments against House Bill 5 (HB 5). The ban will remain in effect during the appeal.

Clinic History 

 Byllye Avery opened the first abortion clinic in Florida in Gainesville. The clinic had blue shag carpets, which for many women at that time gave them comfort as it showed the abortion would not be a bloody affair, requiring tiled, easy-to-clean floors. Between 1982 and 1992, the number of abortion clinics in the state decreased by 7, going from 140 in 1982 to 133 in 1992. In 2017, there were 65 abortion clinics in the state, and over 73% of the counties in the state do not have an abortion clinic. In 2014, 20% of women in the state aged 15–44 lived in a county without an abortion clinic. In 2017, there were 22 Planned Parenthood clinics, of which 13 offered abortion services. At the time, Florida had 4,404,228 women aged 15–49.

Statistics 

In the period between 1972 and 1974, the state had an illegal abortion mortality rate per million women aged 15 – 44 of between 0.1 and 0.9. In 1990, 1,389,000 women in the state faced the risk of an unintended pregnancy. The highest number of legally induced abortions by the state in the years 2000, 2001, and 2003 occurred in New York City with 94,466; 91,792; and 90,820 successful abortions, respectively, followed by Florida with 88,563; 85,589; and 88,247 respectively and Texas with 76,121; 77,409 and 79,166 respectively. In 2014, a poll conducted by the Pew Research Center showed that 56% of the population wanted abortion to remain legal and 38% disagreed with this stance. In 2017, the state had an infant mortality rate of 6.1 deaths per 1,000 live births.

Abortion Related Prosecutions 
In February 2009, Dr. Pierre Jean-Jacques Renelique had his license revoked by the Florida Medical Board. Renelique also had a criminal investigation against him conducted by the Florida Attorney regarding a 2006 incident where it was alleged that a teenage girl gave birth during an abortion procedure, and staff at his clinic disposed of the baby in a garbage bag in an attempt to cover up the events.

Abortion Rights Views and Activities

Protests 
#StopTheBans was created in response to six states passing legislation in early 2019 that would almost completely outlaw abortion. Advocates for reproductive rights wanted to protest this activity as other state legislatures started to consider similar bans as part of a move to try to overturn Roe v. Wade. At least one protest as part of #StopTheBans took place in the state. The Supreme Court overturned Roe v. Wade in Dobbs v. Jackson Women's Health Organization,  later in 2022.

Anti-Abortion Views and Activities

Activities 
In the United States, some states issue specialty license plates that have an anti-abortion theme. Choose Life, an advocacy group founded in 1997, was successful in securing an anti-abortion automobile tag in Florida. Subsequently, the organization has been actively helping groups in other states pursue "Choose Life" license plates.

Violence 
1982 saw a surge in attacks on abortion clinics in the United States, with at least four arson attacks and one bombing. One attack occurred in Illinois and one in Virginia, and two occurred in Florida. These five attacks caused over US$1.1 million in damage. On December 25, 1984, an abortion clinic and two physicians' offices in Pensacola, Florida, were bombed in the early morning of Christmas Day by a quartet of young people, Matt Goldsby, Jimmy Simmons, Kathy Simmons and Kaye Wigginn, who later called the bombings "a gift to Jesus on his birthday". The bombers were caught, convicted and eventually served time in prison for the bombing.

On March 26, 1986, six anti-abortion activists, including John Burt and Joan Andrews, were arrested after invading an abortion clinic in Pensacola, Florida, causing property damage and injuring two women (a clinic manager and a member of the local NOW chapter). Burt was convicted of attempted burglary of an occupied building, assault, battery, and resisting arrest without violence and was sentenced to 141 days already served in jail and four years of probation. His 18-year-old daughter, Sarah Burt, who also took part in the invasion, was sentenced to 15 days in jail (with credit for two days already served) and three years of probation. Andrews refused to pledge not to carry out such actions in the future and was convicted of burglary, criminal mischief, and resisting arrest without violence. She was sentenced to five years in prison, which she spent largely in self-imposed isolation, refusing a mattress and all medical care.

Between 1993 and 2015, 11 people were killed at American abortion clinics. On March 10, 1993, Dr. David Gunn of Pensacola, Florida, was fatally shot during a protest. He had been the subject of wanted-style posters distributed by Operation Rescue in the summer of 1992. Michael F. Griffin was found guilty of Gunn's murder and was sentenced to life in prison. Gunn was the first doctor in the United States to be killed by anti-abortion activists.

On July 29, 1994, Dr. John Britton and James Barrett, a clinic escort, were both shot to death outside the Ladies Center in Pensacola. June Barrett was injured in the shooting. Paul Jennings Hill was charged with the killings, received a death sentence, and was executed on September 3, 2003. The clinic in Pensacola was bombed in 1984 and was also in 2012. Paul Jennings Hill said of his conviction, "I believe in the short and long term, more and more people will act on the principles for which I stand. [...] I'm willing and I feel very honored that they are most likely going to kill me for what I did."

In 1998, there were six arson attacks, four bombings, one murder, and 19 acid attacks at abortion clinics in the United States. The butyric acid attacks took place between May and July in Florida, Louisiana, and Texas. An attack took place at an abortion clinic in Miami, Florida, on May 16, 1998. A few days later, on May 21, 1998, three people were injured when acid was poured at the entrances of five abortion clinics in Miami. On July 4, 2005, a clinic in West Palm Beach, Florida, was the target of a probable arson.

On January 1, 2012, Bobby Joe Rogers, 41, firebombed the American Family Planning Clinic in Pensacola, Florida, with a Molotov cocktail; the fire gutted the building. Rogers told investigators that he was motivated to commit the crime by his opposition to abortion and that what more directly prompted the act was seeing a patient enter the clinic during one of the frequent anti-abortion protests there. The clinic had previously been bombed at Christmas in 1984 and was the site of the murder of Dr. John Britton and James Barrett in 1994. The Army of God published a "Defensive Action Statement" signed by more than two dozen supporters of Hill, saying that "whatever force is legitimate to defend the life of a born child is legitimate to defend the life of an unborn child... if in fact Paul Hill did kill or wound abortion care provider John Britton and clinic assistants James Barrett and Mrs. Barrett, his actions are morally justified if they were necessary for the purpose of defending innocent human life". The organization embraces its description as terrorist.

Footnotes

References 

Florida
Healthcare in Florida
Women in Florida